Mike Bitten (born 2 June 1962) is a Canadian badminton player. He competed in the men's doubles tournament at the 1992 Summer Olympics.

Personal life
Bitten and his wife Doris Piché have two sons together, Will and Sam.

References

External links
 

1962 births
Living people
Canadian male badminton players
Olympic badminton players of Canada
Badminton players at the 1992 Summer Olympics
Sportspeople from Quebec
Commonwealth Games medallists in badminton
Badminton players at the 1986 Commonwealth Games
Badminton players at the 1990 Commonwealth Games
Commonwealth Games silver medallists for Canada
Medallists at the 1990 Commonwealth Games